Palestine–Thailand relations were formalized when the Kingdom of Thailand recognized the State of Palestine as a sovereign state on 18 January 2012. Palestine has a non-resident embassy in Kuala Lumpur, which is accredited to the Thai side, and the Thai embassy in Amman is accredited to the Palestinian side. Both countries are members of the Non-Aligned Movement.

In 2016, President Mahmoud Abbas visited Thailand and met with Prime Minister Prayut Chan-o-cha.

See also
Israel–Thailand relations

References 

Thailand
Palestine